Mohamed Apandi bin Ali (born 11 February 1950) is a Malaysian politician who was the Attorney General of Malaysia from 2015 to 2018. He announced the shocking news that he had cleared then prime minister Najib Razak of any wrongdoing in the 1Malaysia Development Berhad (1MDB) and SRC International cases.

He was on leave on orders of Prime Minister Mahathir Mohamad since 15 May 2018 and prevented from leaving Malaysia. On 5 June 2018, the National Palace of Malaysia made an announcement with the date of 4 June 2018 that His Majesty the Yang di-Pertuan Agong; Sultan Muhammad V has granted to terminate Apandi's service as the Attorney General, and Tommy Thomas will take over the position.

On 28 July 2022, Selangor deputy police chief Sasikala Devi Subramaniam saying that the federal police have started an investigation paper into Apandi, over alleged abuse of power during his time, while handling investigations into the now defunct 1Malaysia Development Berhad (1MDB).

Career
Apandi was appointed as the Attorney General of Malaysia on 27 July 2015 after the termination of Abdul Gani Patail due to health reasons.

Controversies and issues

1MDB scandal
 
On 26 January 2016, Apandi said that nearly $700 million (2.6 billion ringgit) channeled into Prime Minister Najib Razak’s private accounts was a personal donation from Saudi Arabia’s royal family, and cleared him of any criminal wrongdoing.

Former MCA president Ling Liong Sik took a swipe at Apandi's statement that Najib had returned RM2.03 billion to the donor. 

On 11 May 2018, Prime Minister Mahathir Mohamad said he would review Apandi, saying he “undermined his own credibility.” Mahathir accused Apandi to have broken the law by hiding evidence on the alleged misappropriation of funds in sovereign investment firm 1MDB.  

On 15 April 2021, the Court of Appeal heard the press conference held by Apandi to clear Najib of any wrongdoing in the SRC case in 2016 had actually blown up in his face and cast doubt on his integrity. Lead prosecutor V Sithambaram pointed out that the two flow charts which Apandi held up during the press conference clearly reflected how funds which entered Najib's accounts were actually from SRC and not from Arab donations or any other source.

On 8 December 2021, The court of Appeal said the two monetary flow charts revealed by then Apandi already showed it was not Arab donations that went into Najib’s accounts.

On 27 July 2022, Klang MP Charles Santiago lodged a police report against Apandi over alleged abuse of powers to cover up investigations into the SRC International and 1MDB trials. On 29 July, police have launched an investigation against him under Section 217 of the Penal Code.

Suggested freedom for corruption felon
On 22 July 2020, during the Indonesian current affairs talk show, Indonesia's former attorney-general Muhammad Prasetyo said Apandi's alleged role in brokering freedom for Indonesian graft fugitive Djoko Tjandra. Malaysiakini contacted Apandi for comment but he declined.

Legal suits

Lim Kit Siang defamation case
On 5 July 2019, Apandi sued DAP adviser Lim Kit Siang and stated in his statement of claim that on May 6, 2019, Lim had written and caused to be published an article entitled "Dangerous fallacy to think Malaysia’s on the road to integrity". Apandi claimed that the alleged libellous words in the article meant that he was involved in crime and had abetted in the 1MDB scandal, was a person with no morals and integrity, was unethical and had abused his power when he was the AG.

On 23 May 2022, The High Court dismissed Apandi's RM10 million defamation suit against Lim Kit Siang. Judge Azimah Omar in her decision said Lim had succeeded in justifying that he had qualified privilege when making those statements, as former prime minister Najib Razak was found guilty in 2020 in the RM42 million SRC International Sdn Bhd (1MDB's former subsidiary) criminal trial. Judge also ordered Apandi to pay Lim RM80,000 in costs. Apandi subsequently appealed the verdict.

On 22 July 2022, judge Azimah Omar described in her 100-page judgement noted Apandi seemed disinterested and at times self contradictory when testifying in the RM10 million defamation suit he filed against Lim Kit Siang.

Election results

See also
 1Malaysia Development Berhad scandal

References

1950 births
Living people
People from Kelantan
Malaysian people of Malay descent
Malaysian Muslims
Attorneys General of Malaysia
United Malays National Organisation politicians
Commanders of the Order of Loyalty to the Crown of Malaysia
Commanders of the Order of the Defender of the Realm
21st-century Malaysian politicians